Celestial Recordings is a record label founded in 2010 by Steve Kelley. The label specialises in Electronic Music, focusing mainly in Deep and Tech House.

See also
 List of record labels

American record labels
Record labels established in 1998
Record labels disestablished in 2002
Hip hop record labels
Drum and bass record labels